William Clarke, Jr. (born May 4, 1991) is an American football defensive end for the Arlington Renegades of the XFL. He was drafted by the Cincinnati Bengals in the third round of the 2014 NFL Draft. He played college football at West Virginia.

High school career
Clarke attended Taylor Allderdice High School in Pittsburgh, Pennsylvania, where he was a two-time Tribune Review All-City League as tight end and linebacker.

He was considered a two-star recruit by Rivals.com.

College career
Clarke attended West Virginia University from 2009 to 2013. In 2009, he redshirted as a true freshman. In 2010, he played in only four games. In 2011, he played in all 13 games, starting 11, recording 34 tackles, including five for loss and two sacks. In 2012, he started 12 games, recording 26 tackles, including 6.5 for loss and 1.5 sacks. In 2013, he set career highs in tackles (49), tackles for loss (17), and sacks (6), while earning second-team All-Big-12 honors.

Professional career

Cincinnati Bengals
He was drafted by the Cincinnati Bengals in the third round (88th overall) of the 2014 NFL Draft.

On September 2, 2017, Clarke was released by the Bengals.

Tampa Bay Buccaneers
On September 5, 2017, Clarke signed with the Tampa Bay Buccaneers.

On March 15, 2018, Clarke re-signed with the Buccaneers. He was released by the team on September 3, 2018. He was re-signed on September 12, 2018. On October 10, 2018, Clarke was released by the Buccaneers.

St. Louis BattleHawks
Clarke signed with the St. Louis BattleHawks of the XFL in December 2019. He had his contract terminated when the league suspended operations on April 10, 2020.

Detroit Lions 
Clarke had a tryout with the Detroit Lions on August 19, 2020, and signed with the team four days later. He was released on September 5, 2020.

New Orleans Saints
On October 22, 2020, Clarke was signed to the New Orleans Saints practice squad. He was released on November 17, 2020.

Arlington Renegades 
On November 17, 2022, Clarke was drafted by the Arlington Renegades of the XFL.

References

External links
West Virginia Mountaineers bio

Living people
1991 births
Players of American football from Pittsburgh
American football defensive ends
Taylor Allderdice High School alumni
West Virginia Mountaineers football players
Cincinnati Bengals players
Tampa Bay Buccaneers players
St. Louis BattleHawks players
Detroit Lions players
New Orleans Saints players
Arlington Renegades players